The Structure of the Norwegian Army has seen considerable change over the years. In 2009 the Army introduced the new command and control organization. As of June 2021 the army is organized as follows:

Chief of Staff
The Chief of the Army and the Army Staff are based in Bardufoss, Northern Norway.

 Chief of the Army
 Army Staff (Hærstaben)

Brigade Nord
Brigade Nord (English: Brigade North) is the largest unit in the Norwegian Army. The Brigade has several battalions across Norway, including Telemark Battalion at Camp Rena, eastern Norway.

Air defense 
A SHORAD battery unit is under establishment in the artillery battalion, expected to be operative in 2024.

Finnmark Land Command
Further north, the Finnmark Land Command is in charge of safeguarding Norway's northernmost land territories and the land border to Russia. It is a joint command, including an army staff and army and Home Guard units.

Finnmark Land Command (Finnmark Landforsvar), in Porsangmoen
Porsanger Battalion (Porsanger Bataljon), cavalry battalion in Porsangmoen with a K9 Thunder battery 
Garrison of Sør-Varanger (Garnisonen i Sør-Varanger), infantry battalion in Høybuktmoen guarding the Norway–Russia border
17th Home Guard District Finnmark (Finnmark Heimevernsdistrikt 17), in Porsangermoen

Norwegian Army Land Warfare Centre 
 Norwegian Army Land Warfare Centre (Hærens våpenskole), in Terningmoen and Rena
 Norwegian Army Land Warfare Centre departments:
 Maneuver School (Manøverskolen)
 Artillery School (Artilleriskolen)
 Engineer School (Ingeniørskolen)
 Logistics School (Logistikkskolen)
 Signals School (Sambandsskolen)
 Medical School (Sanitetsskolen)
 Army Recruit and Vocational Training School (Hærens skole for rekrutt- og fagutdanning), in Terningmoen and Rena
 Team Leader School (Lagførerskolen)
 NATO Centre of Excellence - Cold Weather Operations (Forsvarets Vinterskole), in Terningmoen, manages as the Norwegian School of Winter Warfare
 Armed Forces dog training establishment(Forsvarets hundeskole), in Sessvollmoen
 Armed Forces CBRN-defense School (Forsvarets ABC-vernskole), in Sessvollmoen
 Army Tactical Training Center (Hærens Taktiske Treningssenter), in Rena
 (Security) Company Østerdalen (Kompani Østerdalen), in Terningmoen

Other units
 His Majesty The King's Guard (Hans Majestet Kongens Garde), in Huseby
 Intelligence Battalion (Etterretningsbataljonen), in Setermoen Military Intelligence & Electronic Warfare unit
 Army Logistic Regiment (Trenregimentet i Hæren), in Bardufoss - maintenance, catering, etc.
 Armed Forces Military Police Department (Forsvarets militærpolitiavdeling), in Rena

Special forces
The Army's special forces unit Forsvarets Spesialkommando (FSK) is no longer part of the army. With the establishment of the Norwegian Special Operations Command in 2014, Norway's two special forces units (FSK and Marinejegerkommandoen) were united under the one command in the Norwegian Armed Forces, with the Air Force's 339 Special Operations Aviation Squadron at Rygge Air Station joining later as the SOC's air force component.

References

Army
Norwegian Army
Norwegian Army